Boligee Hill, now known as Myrtle Hill, is  a historic plantation house near Boligee, Alabama. The Boligee Hill plantation was established in 1835 by Dr. John David Means.  He had migrated to Alabama from  Newberry, South Carolina.  Dr. Means had 110 slaves according to the 1850 Greene County census.  The house was built in 1840. It was acquired by the Hays family in 1869 and renamed Myrtle Hall for the sweet myrtle growing around it.  The property was restored in 2007 by the Beeker family and renamed Myrtle Hill. The house was placed on the National Register of Historic Places on February 19, 1982, due to its architectural significance.

Gallery

References

External links

Photograph of house taken after restoration

National Register of Historic Places in Greene County, Alabama
Houses on the National Register of Historic Places in Alabama
Houses completed in 1840
Plantation houses in Alabama
Houses in Greene County, Alabama
Historic American Buildings Survey in Alabama
1840 establishments in Alabama